Minister of Information Technology or simply Minister of IT, officially known as Minister of Information Technology, Electronics & Communications is a cabinet level ministerial post in the government of Telangana. Created on 2 June 2014, this ministry has one of the important portfolios in the cabinet. The current Minister of IT for the state of Telangana is K. T. Rama Rao.

List of Ministers

References 

Government of Telangana
Telangana ministry
Politics of Telangana
State cabinet ministers of Telangana